Ada María Isasi-Díaz (March 22, 1943 – May 13, 2012) was a Cuban-American theologian who served as professor emerita of ethics and theology at Drew University in Madison, New Jersey. As a Hispanic theologian, she was an innovator of Hispanic theology in general and specifically of mujerista theology. She was founder and co-director of the Hispanic Institute of Theology at Drew University until her retirement in 2009.

Early life and education 
Born on March 22, 1943, Isasi-Díaz was born and raised in Havana, Cuba, to a Roman Catholic family. Her parents were Josefina Díaz Isasi and Domingo G. Isasi-Battle. She graduated from Merici Academy in 1960 and arrived in the United States as a political refugee later that year. She entered the Order of St. Ursula and earned a Bachelor of Arts degree from the College of New Rochelle in New York. In 1967, she went to Lima, Peru, as a missionary for three years. Upon returning to the United States in 1969, she left the order and taught high school for several years in Louisiana, then lived in Spain for 16 months before returning again to the United States. She settled in Rochester, New York. Isasi-Díaz earned a master of arts in medieval history from SUNY Brockport. In 1983, she continued her graduate studies at Union Theological Seminary in New York City where she earned both a Master of Divinity degree and a Doctor of Philosophy degree with a concentration in Christian ethics in 1990. In 2006, she was awarded a Doctor of Divinity honoris causa from Colgate University.

Career 
Her studies and involvement in the feminist theological movement led her to begin to develop a theology from the perspective of Latinas in the United States, which led to the development of mujerista theology. This theology included their religious experiences, practices, and responses to the daily struggles of life. Early in her career Ada was very involved in the women's ordination movement within the Catholic Church. Because of this, Latina women living in the US who are keenly aware of how sexism, ethnic prejudice, and economic oppression subjugate them, use the term mujerista to refer to themselves and use mujerista theology to refer to the explanations of their faith and its role in their struggle for liberation. She was on the faculty of the theological and graduate schools of Drew University from 1991 to 2009. She was a panelist and occasional contributor to the "On Faith" online discussions at The Washington Post and Newsweek.

Mujerista theology 
The term Mujerista was coined by Isasi-Díaz. Mujerista is both a self-identification as well as being a conceptual framework, used in thinking and understanding people, ideas and movements. Latina women living in the US who are aware of how sexism, ethnic prejudice, and economic oppression limit their wholeness of life, use the term mujerista to refer to themselves as well as to mujerista theology, a type of liberation theology that categorizes their faith and its role in their struggle for liberation from distinct experiences of subjugation.

Controversy 
In 2007 she became an unofficial church pastor after the Archdiocese of New York closed Our Lady of Angels Catholic Church in East Harlem, the parish church she attended while in seminary. A group of parishioners began holding protests and prayer meetings outside the building, but eventually it became a neighborhood institution where Isasi-Díaz delivered sermons. In March 2012, Isasi-Díaz's invitation as a keynote speaker at the Vanderhaar Symposium at Christian Brothers University was canceled due to her support for the ordination of women to the Catholic priesthood and because she ministered at her nephew's same-sex marriage ceremony at a Unitarian Church in Washington in 2009.

Death 
She died, after receiving her last rites, in New York on May 13, 2012, from cancer at age 69. Her requiem mass was held at St. Thomas the Apostle Catholic Church in Miami, Florida, on 19 May 2012. Later that day she was buried at Our Lady of Mercy Cemetery.

Publications 

En la Lucha/In the Struggle: Elaborating a Mujerista Theology (Second edition, Fortress Press, 2003)
La Lucha Continues: Mujerista Theology (Orbis Books, 2004)
Mujerista Theology: A Theology for the 21st Century (Orbis Books, 1996)
  Sixth chapter of Transforming the Faiths of Our Fathers: Women Who Changed American Religion, edited by Ann Braude. (2004)

Co-edited/Co-authored books 
 Ada María Isasi-Díaz and Fernando F. Segovia, ed. Hispanic/Latino Theology: Challenge and Promise (Fortress Press, 2006).
 A. Isasi-Díaz and Yolanda Tarango, Hispanic Women: Prophetic Voice in the Church (Harper & Row, 1988)

See also 

 Christian feminism
 Las Hermanas (organization)
 Womanist theology
 Modernism in the Catholic Church (Heresy)

References

External links 
 Faculty page at Drew University

1943 births
2012 deaths
20th-century American Roman Catholic theologians
20th-century American women writers
21st-century American non-fiction writers
21st-century American Roman Catholic theologians
21st-century American women writers
American ethicists
American feminists
American women non-fiction writers
American writers of Cuban descent
Christian ethicists
Christian feminist theologians
College of New Rochelle alumni
Cuban emigrants to the United States
Cuban Roman Catholics
Cuban women writers
Deaths from cancer in New York (state)
Drew University faculty
Feminist studies scholars
LGBT and Catholicism
Cuban LGBT rights activists
Liberation theologians
Newsweek people
Ordination of women and the Catholic Church
People from Havana
The Washington Post people
Union Theological Seminary (New York City) alumni
Ursulines
Women Christian theologians
Women religious writers
Women's ordination activists
World Christianity scholars
Catholic feminists
American women academics
Women civil rights activists